Avondale Williams (born 10 October 1977) is a British Virgin Islander football manager and former player. He played as a forward for Veterans, Rangers, and Islanders FC.  He is the British Virgin Islands national team's all-time leading scorer with five goals.

International career

Saint Vincent and the Grenadines
On 30 July 1995, Williams made his international debut for Saint Vincent and the Grenadines against Trinidad and Tobago, scoring an own goal in a 5–0 loss.

British Virgin Islands
Williams later switched his allegiance to the British Virgin Islands, making his debut on 5 March 2000 and scoring the Nature Boyz' lone goal in a 5–1 loss to Bermuda. He went on to earn fifteen caps for the British Virgin Islands, scoring a record five goals, including a brace against the Bahamas.

Managerial career
Williams was the manager of the British Virgin Islands national football team from 2008 to 2018.

In 2012, he made a return to his national team by substituting himself on in the 41st minute in a 2012 Caribbean Cup match against Martinique.

Career statistics

International 

Scores and results list British Virgin Islands' goal tally first, score column indicates score after each Williams goal.

See also
 List of top international men's football goalscorers by country

References

External links

1977 births
Living people
British Virgin Islands footballers
People with acquired Saint Vincent and the Grenadines citizenship
Saint Vincent and the Grenadines footballers
British Virgin Islands international footballers
Saint Vincent and the Grenadines international footballers
Association football forwards
British Virgin Islands football managers
British Virgin Islands national football team managers
Islanders FC players
Dual internationalists (football)